Bordj Menaïel (from the Arabic برج - bordj, "tower" and Berber imnayen "cavaliers") is a town in the Boumerdès Province in Algeria. As of 2008, the population of the municipality is 64,820.

Presentation
Bordj Menaïel was founded by the Ottoman government of Algeria, most likely in the 16th century, to guard a route between Algiers and Constantine and to secure control of the Isser plain.  In the 18th century, its military role was superseded by the foundation of Bordj Sebaou further west, but it remained the residence of the Ottoman wakil administering the surrounding farmland.

The French conquest reached the fort of Bordj Menaïel in 1844, when General Bugeaud took it.  Afterwards, it initially became the residence of the aghas of the Iflissen Umellil.  In 1859, a French colony was created there by imperial decree, using 1718 hectares.  It was enlarged through land expropriation in 1872 by Admiral de Gueydon, in the wake of the Mokrani Revolt.

History

French conquest

 Expedition of the Col des Beni Aïcha (1837)
 First Battle of the Issers (1837)

Algerian Revolution

Salafist terrorism

 2008 Zemmouri bombing (9 August 2008)
 2010 Bordj Menaïel bombing (21 September 2010)

Transport
The road RN 12 runs through Bordj Menaïel, linking it with Isser to the west and Naciria to the east.

Sports
Algeria goalkeeper Faouzi Chaouchi was born in Bordj Menaiel.  The local football team is JS Bordj Ménaïel.

Notable people

 Farouk Belkaïd, footballer
 Bachir Boudjelid, footballer
 Faouzi Chaouchi, footballer
 Zinedine Ferhat, footballer
 Omar Fetmouche, artist
 Hocine Mezali, journalist and writer
 Mustapha Toumi, songwriter, lyricist, composer, poet and painter
 Fatma Zohra Zamoum, writer and film-maker

References

 Charles-Claude Bernard, 1877. Notice topographique et médicale sur le plaine d'Isser. Blida: A. Mauguin.
 Kouider Djouab, 2017. Bordj-Menaïel, une ville, une histoire : La Ville des coquelicots. Saint Denis: Edilivre.

Notes

Communes of Boumerdès Province